Maroof is a village situated alongside Jalalpur–Gujrat Road in the district of Gujrat, Pakistan.

Villages in Gujrat District